Neanops is a genus of beetles in the family Carabidae, containing the following species:

 Neanops caecus (Britton, 1960)
 Neanops pritchardi Valentine, 1987

References

Trechinae